The Ascoideaceae are a family of yeasts in the order Saccharomycetales. A monotypic taxon, it contains the single genus Ascoidea. Species in the family have a widespread distribution, and typically grow in beetle galleries in dead wood.

References

Saccharomycetes
Ascomycota families
Monogeneric fungus families
Taxa named by Joseph Schröter
Taxa described in 1894